Local elections were held for South Ribble Borough Council on 7 May 2015, the same day as the 2015 United Kingdom general election and other 2015 United Kingdom local elections. Local elections are held every four years with all councillors up for election in multi-member electoral wards.

Boundary review
The Local Government Boundary Commission for England reviewed the local boundaries of South Ribble Borough Council in 2014.

The number of councillors elected to South Ribble council was reduced to 50, from the wards outlined below. The changes were made official by The South Ribble (Electoral Changes) Order 2014.

Ward Results

See also
South Ribble

References
 South Ribble Borough Council (PDF)

2015 English local elections
May 2015 events in the United Kingdom
2015
2010s in Lancashire